"Welcome to My Life" is a song by Canadian rock band Simple Plan. "Welcome to My Life" was released to radio on September 14, 2004, as the lead single from their second studio album, Still Not Getting Any... (2004). It peaked at number 40 on the US Billboard Hot 100, number seven in Australia, and number five in New Zealand. The song is certified gold in the US and platinum in Australia.

Content and music video
The song's intention is to express teenage angst about life becoming so frustrating that no one can understand how awful it is for them. In the music video, a traffic jam is seen and scenes are shown in which passengers deal with dysfunctional families and how the families' dysfunction affects their lives. At the end of the video, a few of the people in the traffic jam get out of their cars and begin to walk down the road. The video received some criticism for being similar to R.E.M.'s "Everybody Hurts". It was shot at the Henry Ford Bridge and the Commodore Schuyler F. Heim Bridge in San Pedro, Los Angeles.

Chart performance
"Welcome to My Life" became another top-40 hit on the US Billboard Hot 100, peaking at the number-40 position. It reached the top 10 in Australia and New Zealand, peaking at number seven in the former country and number five in the latter. The song become band's first number one on the Canadian Hot 100.

Track listings

UK and European CD single
 "Welcome to My Life"
 "Addicted" (live)

UK 7-inch single
A. "Welcome to My Life"
B. "Worst Day Ever" (live)

Australian CD single
 "Welcome to My Life"
 "Addicted" (live)
 "Worst Day Ever" (live)

Charts

Weekly charts

Year-end charts

Certifications

Release history

References

2004 singles
2004 songs
Lava Records singles
Rock ballads
Simple Plan songs
Song recordings produced by Bob Rock
Songs about depression
Songs about loneliness
Songs about suicide
Songs written by Chuck Comeau
Songs written by Pierre Bouvier